The following is a list of United States senators and representatives who died of natural and accidental causes, due to illnesses, and by suicide, while they were serving their terms between 1900 and 1949. For a list of members of Congress who were murdered while they were in office during that same time (with the exception of Congressman Pinckney, as he is listed below), see List of United States Congress members killed or wounded in office.

Party colors:

1900s

1910s

1920s

1930s

1940s

See also 
 List of United States Congress members who died in office (1790–1899)
 List of United States Congress members who died in office (1950–1999)
 List of United States Congress members who died in office (2000–)

References

External links 
 Memorial Services for members of the U.S. Congress who died in the 1910s
 Memorial Services for members of the U.S. Congress who died in the 1920s
 Memorial Services for members of the U.S. Congress who died in the 1930s
 Memorial Services for members of the U.S. Congress who died in the 1940s

1900